The 1983 Daytona 500, the 25th running of the event, was held February 20 at Daytona International Speedway in Daytona Beach, Florida as the first race of the 1983 NASCAR Winston Cup season.

Summary
However, on his second of two qualifying laps, Yarborough crashed and flipped his car in turn four. The car was destroyed in the crash, and Ranier-Lundy did not have a back up car for Yarborough to race. Thus, the team had to scramble to find a replacement and eventually found a Hardee’s restaurant displaying a Pontiac LeMans painted like the #28 and used for promotional purposes; that car was brought to Daytona and restored to racing condition, with Yarborough starting it from the eighth position. 

Ricky Rudd wound up with the pole, driving Richard Childress' Chevrolet in what would become a breakthrough season for the longtime independent driver Childress. The early laps were a battle between Geoff Bodine, Richard Petty, Dale Earnhardt, Kyle Petty, and a resurgent Dick Brooks.  Richard broke away from the field before his engine failed after 47 laps and the race became a showdown between Bodine, Yarborough, Joe Ruttman, Brooks, Neil Bonnett, Buddy Baker, and Bill Elliott, while former Talladega 500 winner Ron Bouchard was also in contention.

On Lap 63, the engine on the Bud Moore Engineering Ford driven by Earnhardt failed. As the race went on the lead bounced back and forth, and Bobby Allison, who'd lost a lap, crowded the leaders most of the day. Past halfway Kyle Petty blew his engine and a tire issue dropped Bonnett off the lead lap; when Mark Martin hit the wall Ruttman swerved to stop Bonnett from getting his lap back as they raced through a group of lapped cars. Bonnett got his lap back later but blew his engine in the final twenty laps while Brooks cut a tire and lost a lap.

On the final lap, Baker led Yarborough, Ruttman, and Elliott.  Cale stormed past Baker on the backstretch and Ruttman drafted into second; Baker dove under Ruttman and Elliott snookered them both on the high side in a three-abreast photo finish for second. The win was Cale's third in the 500 and was also the first time that an in-car camera of a car went into victory lane before a national CBS Sports audience.

Waltrip-Brooks incident
With Brooks as the leader, the field slowed down coming back to the yellow.  Two cars, though, tried to get their lap back by beating the leader back to the finish line, a practice banned subsequently in 2003 - Lake Speed passed Brooks in Turn Four and then moved into his path; Brooks braked and Darrell Waltrip spun to avoid hitting Brooks; Waltrip's Chevrolet struck the inside guardrail and flew backward back onto the racetrack, nearly collecting Yarborough, Bodine, and Ruttman.

Waltrip suffered a concussion, resulting in an overnight hospitalization.  He returned the next week at Richmond, which would be prohibited under a 2014 rule change.  Waltrip admitted in his biography DW: A Lifetime Going Round in Circles (published in 2002) that it was a life-changing crash: when he heard drivers and fans joking that the crash would "knock him conscious" or "finally shut him up", he realized for the first time how unpopular he was and resolved to clean up his image. Waltrip often referenced the crash when asked to be a keynote speaker at national events.

The practice of allowing lapped cars to attempt passing the leader at the finish line when taking the caution was prohibited after the 2003 Sylvania 300 at Loudon, NH when after Dale Jarrett crashed and numerous cars nearly struck Jarrett's disabled car on the race to gain a lap back, leading to the development of the current beneficiary rule.  The concussion protocol was adopted in 2014 after Dale Earnhardt Jr. took himself out of two races in the 2012 season after two concussions—one in August (Kansas tire test) and in October (Talladega race crash).

Did not qualify
Drivers who failed to qualify for this event include Blackie Wangerin, Joe Millikan, Connie Saylor, Morgan Shepherd, Rusty Wallace and David Simko.

• This would be the only time Rusty Wallace ever failed to qualify for a race in his 25-year career.

Finishing Order

References

Daytona 500
Daytona 500
Daytona 500
NASCAR races at Daytona International Speedway